Prior to its uniform adoption of proportional representation in 1999, the United Kingdom used first-past-the-post for the European elections in England, Scotland and Wales. The European Parliament constituencies used under that system were smaller than the later regional constituencies and only had one Member of the European Parliament each. The constituency of Glasgow was one of them.

Boundaries
1979-1984: Glasgow Cathcart, Glasgow Central, Glasgow Craigton, Glasgow Garscadden, Glasgow Govan, Glasgow Hillhead, Glasgow Kelvingrove, Glasgow Maryhill, Glasgow Pollok, Glasgow Provan, Glasgow Queen's Park, Glasgow Shettleston, Glasgow Springburn.

1984-1999: Glasgow Cathcart, Glasgow Central, Glasgow Garscadden, Glasgow Govan, Glasgow Hillhead, Glasgow Maryhill, Glasgow Pollok, Glasgow Provan, Glasgow Shettleston, Glasgow Springburn.

Members of the European Parliament

Election results

References

External links
 David Boothroyd's United Kingdom Election Results 

European Parliament constituencies in Scotland (1979–1999)
Politics of Glasgow
1979 establishments in Scotland
1999 disestablishments in Scotland
Constituencies established in 1979
Constituencies disestablished in 1999